Khar (Marathi pronunciation: [kʰaːɾ]) is an affluent suburb of Mumbai, north of Bandra and south of Santacruz, Mumbai. Originally one of the 'villages' that made up the larger Bandra, the present suburb is divided into Khar West and Khar East areas. It is serviced by Khar Road railway station of the Mumbai Suburban Railway network. It is an area within convenient distances of several schools, restaurants, parks, promenades and shopping centres. Khar bears the Mumbai Postal Index Number (Pin Code) 400052.

Khar, which is derived from the word Khāra (meaning 'salty' in the local language Marathi) has acquired this name in reference to the salt pans that were used to farm salt by locals near the Khar Danda sea shore a couple of centuries ago. Here, one also finds the historic fishing village of "Khar Danda", which is one of the villages that made up the original Bandra area and is also one of the oldest settlements of Mumbai.

History

	
Most of the historic Khar area of Vandre (Bandra) was a marshland of salty sea water. Alongside fishing, salt production was one of the vocations that sustained the earliest dwellers of Khar Danda.
	
Pathare Prabhus were one of the earliest inhabitants of Khar, from almost a century and half ago. In the early 1900s, the Pathare Prabhu community lived in South Mumbai and used their quaint bungalows in Khar as weekend dwellings. Khar Danda was one of the original villages of the erstwhile larger Bandra. Back then, the local Bandra railway station was felt distant to alight from trains and hire 'tangas' (horse carriages) to get to these bungalows in the Khar part of Bandra. Keeping these factors in mind, as well as the growing number of homes in this part, a second railway station named 'Khar Road' was introduced in north Bandra on 1 July 1924. This development is the primary reason for Khar to start being spoken of as a suburb by itself. The Pathare Prabhu community still has land ownership over a large area of Bandra/Khar.

Schools and colleges

Following are the educational institutions located at Khar:
 Podar International School (IB & CAIE)
 Khar Municipal School
 ST Elias High School
 B.P.M. High School
 Sacred Heart Boys School
 Khar Education Society's College of Commerce & Economics.
 M.M. Pupils
 Kamla High School and Jr. College
 Bloomingdales Pre-primary / Jasudben M. L. School (ICSE)
 R.V. Technical high School
 Guru Nanak Mission High School
 Beacon High
 Anuyog Vidyalaya
 Cardinal Gracious High School

Religious places  

 Shankar Mandir
 Maruai Devi Mandir
 Shree Siddhivinayak Devastan
 Digamber Jain Temple
 Ahimsa Bhawan Jain Sthanak on 14A Road
 Jain Temple at 5th Road
 St. Vincent De Paul Church, Khar
 Ghanteshwar Temple Mumbai, Khar west
 Gayatri Mandir 12th Road Khar west
 Ram Mandir 12th Road Khar west
 Rama Krishna Mission 12th Road Khar west
 Guru Gangeshwar Dham 6th Road Khar west
 Khatwari Darbar Linking Road Khar west
 Shri Guru Singh Sabha Gurudwara Station Road Khar west
 Khar Markaz Masjid Old Khar Khar west
 Shri Aniruddha Gurukshetram, Old Khar

Medical facilities 
 Hinduja Healthcare Surgical
 Mahavir Hospital on Ahimsa Marg (14A Road)
 Ram krishna mission hospital
 Beams Hospital 18A Road Khar west

See also 
 Pali Naka
 Khar Danda

References

Suburbs of Mumbai